Saille is a Belgian black metal band formed in 2009. The band uses classical instruments as well as traditional black metal instruments. Saille has released five studio albums so far.

History

Formation (2009-2010)
Saille started as a one-person, one-time project by Dries Gaerdelen (keyboards). During recording of the debut album in 2009–2010, the idea of a real live band grew on him, and a complete band was formed in summer 2010.

Irreversible Decay (2011)
Recording for the first album, Irreversible Decay, began in late 2009 at Shumcot Studio, Belgium. The album was completed in September 2010 and released on 4 March 2011 on the Italian label Code666 records.

Live shows for the album concluded with a spot at Belgium's biggest metalfest, Graspop Metal Meeting, in June 2012. In December 2012 Saille appeared at EMM - Eindhoven Metal Meeting.

Ritu (2013)
In July 2012 the band hit the Shumcot Studio again to record their second album Ritu. With lyrics inspired by death rites in ancient cultures, this album had a much darker setting than the first. Again classically skilled guest musicians were invited. After two months of intensive recording sessions, the final mix was finished in September 2012 and sent to the Norwegian mastering specialist Tom Kvålsvoll (Strype Audio), known for mastering black metal classics including Mayhem, Emperor, Arcturus, Limbonic Art, Ulver, and Vreid.

Ritu was released as a digipak edition on 18 January 2013. Saille then faced an intensive year. That month they embarked on their first tour, with Transylvanian black metal band Negura Bunget, followed by more gigs in Belgium and the Netherlands, supporting bands like Textures, Von, Winterfylleth and The Monolith Death Cult. A promotional/official video for the opening track of the album Blood Libel was set for release in June 2013. During the summer, Saille was invited to perform at several festivals including Antwerp Metal Fest (with Napalm Death), Vlamrock (with Exhumed, Belphegor, and Rotting Christ) and Metal Méan (with Marduk and Dying Fetus). In September, they went to the UK for some gigs supporting Winterfylleth, a British band they consider as friends since they first met at Graspop in 2012. The band released another official video, a live recording of the track Tephra captured at Metal Méan, in November 2013 and went to Denmark for a headlining position at Black Winter Fest in Copenhagen.

Eldritch (2014)
Saille recorded their third album, Eldritch, starting in May 2014 while continuing to play gigs including at Tongeren Metal Fest (with Asphyx and Angel Witch), a show supporting Carach Angren in the Netherlands, and the Ancienne Belgique with Mayhem (from Norway). In July, they played in Germany for the first time. The album was recorded in different studios, to get a different approach for each group of instruments. Again classical instruments were recorded, including a grand piano, a 100-year-old pianola, and small vocal choirs. Mixing and mastering were handled by Klas Blomgren from Sweden (known for his work for Svart's last CD).

Eldritch was released on 10 November, again by Code666 as a digipak edition. To promote the release, a three-day promotour with Winterfylleth took place in Belgium and the Netherlands. The band's second performance at Eindhoven Metal Meeting concluded the year.

In 2015 Saille experienced significant growth in terms of important performances. They shared stages with bands including Moonspell, Septicflesh, Eye of Solitude, Impaled Nazarene, Nargaroth, Dødheimsgard, Thulcandra, and Cradle of Filth Belgium, the Netherlands and the UK. In May they participated in a tour supporting Negura Bunget, visiting France and Spain for the first time. During the summer 'festival season' they performed at festivals in Molins de Rei/Barcelona, Spain, in June, at the British Bloodstock Open Air, and in Austria in August. An official videoclip for the track "Aklo" was released in August 2015.

This continued throughout 2016, but mainly focussed on Germany: Saille played at Dark Easter Metal Meeting (Munich) in March, Ragnarök Festival (Lichtenfels) in April and Summer Breeze Open Air in August. In between they also did a show at Incineration Fest in London.

Gnosis (2017)
During September 2016 Saille also announced that they were recording their fourth album, Gnosis. After some significant line-up changes the band decided to continue as a five-piece. The album was mixed and mastered by the Wiesławscy brothers at Hertz Studio, Poland, and was released on 17 March 2017.

V (2021)
Saille's fifth studio album, V, was released on 9 April 2021. It is the band's first release on Black Lion Records.

Band members

Current members
Reinier Schenk - guitars (2009 - present)
Kristof Van Iseghem - bass (2014 - present)
Juanjo Pérez - guitars (2019 - present)
Jesse Peetoom - vocals (2019 - present)
Tony Van Den Eynde - drums (2021 - present)

Former members
Yves Callaert - guitars (2010 - 2012)
Gert Monden - drums (2009 - 2013)
Didier Vancampo - bass (2010 - 2014)
Jonathan Vanderwal - guitars (2009 - 2016); vocals (2009 - 2011)
Dries Gaerdelen - keyboards, theremin (2009 - 2016)
Dennie Grondelaers - vocals (2012 - 2017)
Kevin De Leener - drums (2013 - 2017) 
Collin Boone - guitars (2016 - 2018)
Yoeri Gemeen - drums (2017 - 2019) 
Xavier De Schuyter - vocals (2017 - 2019)
Guillaume Singer - guitars (2018 - 2019)

Discography
2011 - Irreversible Decay - Code666 Records
2013 - Ritu - Code666 Records
2014 - Eldritch - Code666 Records
2017 - Gnosis - Code666 Records
2021 - V - Black Lion Records

References

External links

 Official Website

Musical groups established in 2009
Symphonic black metal musical groups